Hydee Feldstein Soto (born 1958) is an attorney and American politician, who is the incumbent City Attorney of Los Angeles. A member of the Democratic Party, her candidacy was endorsed by the Los Angeles Times.

Early life and career 
Feldstein Soto was born in 1958 in San Juan, Puerto Rico and moved to the United States at age 17 to attend Swarthmore College and Columbia Law School, graduating from the latter in 1982. As an attorney, she served as a general counsel and worked in several private practices.

Political career 
In 2021, Feldstein Soto announced her candidacy for Los Angeles City Attorney. She prevailed in the general election, becoming first female City Attorney in Los Angeles history.

References 

1958 births
Living people
American politicians of Puerto Rican descent
California Democrats
Jewish American people in California politics
Los Angeles City Attorneys
People from San Juan, Puerto Rico
Puerto Rican Jews
Swarthmore College alumni
Columbia Law School alumni